Richard George Penn Curzon, 4th Earl Howe,  (28 April 1861 – 10 January 1929), styled Viscount Curzon between 1876 and 1900, was a British courtier and Conservative politician. He served as Treasurer of the Household between 1896 and 1900 and was Lord Chamberlain to Queen Alexandra.

Background and education
Curzon was the eldest son of Richard Curzon-Howe, 3rd Earl Howe, and wife Isabella Maria Katherine Anson, daughter of Major-General The Hon. George Anson and wife The Hon. Isabella Elizabeth Annabella Weld-Forester.
He was educated at Eton and Christ Church, Oxford.

Career
He served as a member of the council of Royal College of Music in London; and on the committee of Queen Alexandra's field force fund. Then he worked with the British military forces as honorary lieutenant colonel in the 2nd battalion Royal Leicestershire Regiment voluntary regiment, and voluntary regiment captain for Leicestershire Yeomanry, he gained a Territorial Decoration.

Politics
In 1885, Curzon was elected Member of Parliament for Wycombe. He became a government member when he was appointed Treasurer of the Household under Lord Salisbury in 1896, a post he held until 1900, when he inherited his father's titles and gave up his seat in the House of Commons. He then served as  From 1900 to 1903 and he served as Lord-in-waiting under Salisbury and then Arthur Balfour; he served Queen Victoria 1900-1901, and King Edward VII 1901-1903. In 1903 he was made a Knight Grand Cross of the Royal Victorian Order and appointed Lord Chamberlain to Queen Alexandra. He served in that post until the Queen's death in 1925.

Lord Howe was also a captain in the Prince Albert's Own Leicestershire Yeomanry Cavalry, an honorary lieutenant-colonel in the 2nd Battalion of the Leicestershire Volunteer Regiment and a Justice of the Peace for Buckinghamshire.

His brother-in-law, Lord Randolph Churchill, appointed him one of his two literary executors; in that capacity he gave his consent to Winston Churchill writing the biography of his father, although with some reluctance.

Honours and decorations
Lord Howe was appointed a Knight Grand Cross of the Royal Victorian Order (GCVO) in 1903.

He also received several foreign awards:
Order of Leopold (Belgium).
Order of Charles III Spain.
Order of St. Olav Norway.
Order of the White Eagle (Poland).
Order of the Dannebrog from Denmark.
Order of the Polar Star from Sweden.
Order of the Red Eagle from Prussia.
Grand officer in Legion of Honour.
Order of the Redeemer of Greece.

Family
Lord Howe married Lady Georgiana Elizabeth Spencer-Churchill (14 May 1860 – 9 February 1906), the fifth daughter of John Spencer-Churchill, 7th Duke of Marlborough, and wife Lady Frances Anne Emily Vane, on 4 June 1883 at St George's, Hanover Square. Thus, he was Winston Churchill's uncle by marriage. They had one son, Francis. 

Lady Georgiana Curzon and Lady Chesham initiated in December 1899 the funding of a hospital to be sent to South Africa with the Imperial Yeomanry fighting in the Second Boer War. They raised more than £100,000, leading to the creation of the Imperial Yeomanry Hospital, with a base hospital, a field hospital and bearer companies. Lady Howe later edited a book recording the work of the Imperial Yeomanry Hospital, published in December 1902.

After his first wife's death in 1906, Curzon married Florence, Dowager Marchioness of Dufferin and Ava, in 1919. After her death in 1925, he married his first cousin once removed, Lorna Curzon. He died in January 1929, aged 67, and was succeeded by his only son, Francis. The Countess Howe died in February 1961.

References

Work cited

External links

1861 births
1929 deaths
People educated at Eton College
Alumni of Christ Church, Oxford
Conservative Party (UK) Baronesses- and Lords-in-Waiting
4
Knights Grand Cross of the Royal Victorian Order
Curzon, Richard Curson, Viscount
Treasurers of the Household
Curzon, Richard Curson, Viscount
Curzon, Richard Curson, Viscount
Curzon, Richard Curson, Viscount
Curzon, Richard Curson, Viscount
Howe, E4
Richard
Richard
Presidents of the Marylebone Cricket Club